Hal Ketchum was an American country music artist. His discography consists of 11 studio albums, two compilation albums, 27 singles, one video album, and 13 music videos. 17 of his singles charted on the Billboard Hot Country Songs chart between 1991 and 2006.

Albums

Studio albums

Compilation albums

Singles

As lead artist

As featured artist

Other appearances

Videography

Video albums

Music videos

Notes

References

Country music discographies
Discographies of American artists